Oak Lake Beach is a community in the Canadian province of Manitoba, located on the shore of Oak Lake. It is located within the Rural Municipality of Sifton.

See also
List of communities in Manitoba

References

Unincorporated communities in Westman Region